Omer Damari (born 24 March 1989)  is an Israeli former footballer, He is the current head coach of Hapoel Tel Aviv's U17 team.

Club career

Maccabi Petah Tikva
Omer grew up in the youth ranks for Maccabi Petah Tikva and made his debut for the senior side on 21 November 2006 in a Toto Cup Al game against F.C. Ashdod. Due to his speed and ball skills he was deployed in wide midfield mostly but later became the leading striker for Maccabi due to good goalscoring form. He made 146 appearances for Maccabi, starting 88 matches, with 58 substitute appearances and scoring 34 goals.

Hapoel Tel Aviv
On 3 July 2011, Damari moved to Hapoel Tel Aviv costing €1.5 million, where he signed a five-year contract with €3 million buy-out clause. Damari helped Hapoel to the Israel State Cup during his first year at the club. He made 101 league appearances for Hapoel, scoring 56 goals in the process. During the 2013–14 season he scored a career high 26 league goals and 31 in all competitions. His fine play during the season led to interest from various clubs throughout Europe.

Austria Wien
In July 2014 Damari signed with Austria Wien. On 9 August 2014, Damari made his first appearance for the club scoring the opening goal for Wien in a 2–2 draw with SC Wiener Neustadt. He ended the season scoring 10 goals in 15 appearances.

RB Leipzig
In January 2015 Damari signed with RB Leipzig of the 2. Bundesliga.

Red Bull Salzburg
On 30 July 2015, Damari was loaned to sister club FC Red Bull Salzburg for one season. Damari established himself as a starter for Salzburg but was limited to 16 league games due to injury in which he managed to score four goals and provide four assists. He helped the club to the league and cup title during his loan spell.

New York Red Bulls
On 4 August 2016, Damari was once again sent on loan by RB Leipzig, this time to New York Red Bulls. Damari made his debut for New York on 13 August coming on in the second half in a 3–1 victory against the Montreal Impact. The following week, Damari scored his first goal for the club in a 1–1 draw against Alianza F.C. in the CONCACAF Champions League.

Maccabi Haifa
On 12 January 2017, Damari signed a contract with Maccabi Haifa.

Hapoel Tel Aviv
On 13 July 2018, Damari signed a contract with Hapoel Tel Aviv.

Managerial career

On June 14, 2021, after a year of not playing football professionally, Damari announced his retirement from active play.
On the same day, he was appointed coach of the Hapoel Tel Aviv's U17 team.

International career
During the 2010–11 Israeli Premier League season Damari scored 15 goals and was called up for the national team for the first time. On 17 November 2010 he made his debut in a friendly against Iceland at Bloomfield Stadium in Tel Aviv, scoring two goals in the opening fifteen minutes of a 3–2 win.

Damari was selected by Eli Guttman for  UEFA Euro 2016 qualifying. On 13 October 2014, he scored a hat-trick in a 4–1 away win over Andorra, the first goal coming in the third minute.

Career statistics

International goals
Scores and results list Israel's goal tally first, score column indicates score after each Damari goal.

Honours

Club
Hapoel Tel Aviv
Israel State Cup: 2012

Red Bull Salzburg
Austrian Bundesliga: 2015–16
Austrian Cup: 2015–16

International
Maccabi Haifa
Israeli Premier League: player of the week 2017–18

References

External links

1989 births
Jewish footballers
Living people
Israeli footballers
Association football forwards
Israel international footballers
Israel under-21 international footballers
Maccabi Petah Tikva F.C. players
Hapoel Tel Aviv F.C. players
FK Austria Wien players
RB Leipzig players
FC Red Bull Salzburg players
New York Red Bulls players
Maccabi Haifa F.C. players
Israeli Premier League players
Austrian Football Bundesliga players
2. Bundesliga players
Major League Soccer players
Israeli expatriate footballers
Expatriate footballers in Austria
Expatriate footballers in Germany
Israeli expatriate sportspeople in Austria
Israeli expatriate sportspeople in Germany
Footballers from Rishon LeZion
Designated Players (MLS)
Israeli Mizrahi Jews